Martin Výborný (25 April 1976) is a Czech former professional ice hockey player.

He played with HC Slovan Bratislava in the Slovak Extraliga.

References

Living people
HC Slovan Bratislava players
1976 births
Czech ice hockey defencemen
Sportspeople from Mladá Boleslav
Czech expatriate ice hockey players in Slovakia
HC Oceláři Třinec players
HK Nitra players
HC Plzeň players